Acrolophus punctellus is a moth of the family Acrolophidae. It was described by August Busck in 1907. It is found in North America, including Arizona.

References

Moths described in 1907
punctellus